Margret Nikolova (born October 10, 1928, Sofia) is a Bulgarian pop singer. She was awarded the title of Honored Artist of Bulgaria in 1964.

Biography
In 1964, Margret Nikolova performed at a Sopot International Song Festival, where she won third place. In the same 1969 the song, which he performed together with Kiril Semov  I Had a Dream, won the grand prize of the festival Golden Orpheus for Bulgarian song.   Nikolova became widely known in the Soviet Union in a duet with 
Georgi Kordov thanks to the performance of song Alyosha. 

Margret's husband Pyotr Nikolov is a writer.

In 2000, the 72-year-old singer  stopped her professional and creative activity.

Honours
 Order of Saints Cyril and Methodius II degrees (1961)
 Order of the Red Banner of Labor  (1961)
 Crystal Necklace Award from the Union of Music and Dance Figures in Bulgaria   (2018)

References

External links
 Маргрет Николова – Музикални следи (2006 г., биографичен филм)

1928 births
Living people
Musicians from Sofia
Bulgarian pop singers
Women pop singers
20th-century Bulgarian women singers
21st-century Bulgarian women singers